The Baylor University Chamber of Commerce (usually called "Chamber of Commerce," "Baylor Chamber," or simply "Chamber") is the oldest student organization at Baylor University.  It was founded in 1919.

Purpose
The organization's stated purpose: "In order to promote the general welfare of Baylor University the purpose of this organization shall be: to stress the importance of Leadership, Service, and Scholarship in daily life; to promote an active interest in the Athletic, Academic, Traditional, and Cultural aspects of Baylor University; to foster an atmosphere of unity among the membership which creates effective service; and to encourage communication and good will among all the peoples of Baylor University, as well as among those with whom this organization comes in contact."

Beginning
The Baylor Chamber of Commerce traces its origin to February 26, 1919, when the Baylor Business Men's Club was organized by a group of students interested in a business career. The club was formed when no business classes were offered at the University. The first officers of the club were Henry Craig, President; H. L. Roach, Vice President; and J. C. Jones, Secretary-Treasurer. This group of Baylor men, most of whom lived at Ma Greer's boarding house on Fifth Street, felt a definite need for an organization to help promote Baylor University. Cited by the Baylor Lariat as "the most promising organization on campus," the Chamber was to be the chief influence in building the Baylor spirit.

Name change
Promoting Baylor University and initiating projects to benefit the university, the Business Men's Club realized its kinship to that of a city chamber of commerce.  On March 10, 1920, the Business Men's Club adopted the name "Baylor University Chamber of Commerce." The Baylor University Chamber of Commerce was the first university chamber of commerce specifically established to promote a university.

Chamber firsts

School of Commerce
On February 8, 1923, the Chamber sent a letter to Baylor President Samuel Palmer Brooks petitioning him to establish a school of business at Baylor. The men signing the petition on behalf of the entire Chamber knew "full well that the School is of interest to many students already in attendance and, hundreds of others [who] in the next few years will be drawn to Baylor University in order to acquire the theoretical and practical values [attached] to courses offered in proper correlation in a Baylor University School of Commerce." That same year, President Brooks organized the School of Business.

Athletics
In 1924, the Chamber began the intramural sports program to promote class rivalries and to discover talent for the Baylor athletic programs. The program originated with an intramural track meet intended to, "stimulate interest in track and to get the track prospects into shape." 
 same year, Chamber also presented the band new uniforms through monetary pledges solicited from the Baylor and Waco communities. Moreover, the year 1924 marked the beginning of the annual Football Banquet. The first banquet honored Baylor's 1924 Southwest Conference Championship team.

Yell Leaders
Baylor's Yell Leaders were equipped with proper green and gold uniforms in 1926. In 1929, a Yell Leader Fund was established in order to pay for the expenses of out of town games attended by the Yell Leaders. The Chamber assumed responsibility for that group, as well as Baylor's pep rallies, in 1937. This continued until 1967, when the Chamber relinquished its responsibilities for the Yell Leaders.

Good Will Week
Also in 1926, the Chamber began the tradition of "Good Will Week" to foster friendships and deepen personal relationships among students. This event, which preceded the Homecoming game, was officially designated Homecoming Week in 1969. While Homecoming itself had been established in 1909, the year 1936 marked Chamber sponsorship of the Homecoming Parade and the crowning of Baylor's first Homecoming Queen. Today, the parade is recognized as the oldest and largest collegiate parade in the nation.

Baylor's Fight Song
In 1940, the Chamber sponsored the selection of a new Baylor Fight Song, which was composed by Fred Waring and introduced on December 20, 1940. This song, "Bear Down You Bears of Old Baylor U.," was announced on Waring's National Broadcast.

The Green and Gold Fountain
In 1963, the Chamber financed the building of the circular Green and Gold Fountain, originally situated on what became known as Fountain Mall; dedicated to the Baylor-Waco Foundation in 1964, this was further evidence of the work of the Chamber on the Baylor campus. The year 1964 also marked the beginning of Cub Week, designed to honor the Freshman Class. This event was discontinued in 1968. In 1964, the Bob Hope Benefit Show, which netted $14,000 for the Baylor Library Fund, was sponsored and publicized by the Chamber.

Campus events

Homecoming
Homecoming has been a tradition at Baylor since 1909. (See above, "Good Will Week") Thousands of alumni return to Baylor for the weekend's festivities. Homecoming weekend kicks off with a Worship Service during Wednesday's Chapel. Mass Meeting, initially only open to freshmen, but now open to all students follows on Thursday.  This event is designed to explain some of Baylor's great traditions and memories to new students. One memory is that of the Immortal Ten. On Friday, Alumni have the opportunity to attend Pigskin Revue, Pep Rally, Extravaganza, and Bonfire. Saturday's events begin with the nation's oldest and largest collegiate Homecoming Parade.  After that, alumni and students cheer the Bears on at the football game. The Chamber is given the privilege of organizing, funding, planning, and executing this entire weekend.

Diadeloso
Diadeloso is a campus-wide holiday that occurs each spring.  Students are invited to enjoy the spring weather and festivities on campus that include student organization booths, intramural tournaments, a dog show, food, and a music festival.  It was originally known as May Day, then All-University Day, was founded in 1934 and transferred to Chamber control in the early 1940s. The name Diadeloso (Spanish for "Day of the Bear") was adopted following a campus name contest in 1966. Diadeloso changed to the majority of its present format in 1983. In 2016, Baylor added Nochedeloso, (Spanish for "Night of the Bear") which takes place on the Monday night preceding Diadeloso. In both 2016 and 2017, the night was marked by an airing of the latest Star Wars movie in McLane Stadium.

Family Weekend
In 1960, a special day was designated to introduce the University to Baylor parents. By 1970, the event had become a full weekend known as Parents Weekend, featuring a student talent show, a parent-faculty coffee, a dinner on the grounds, and other events designed to show parents the best of Baylor. In 2012, the name of the event changed from "Parents Weekend" to "Parent and Family Weekend". The change was made to better reflect the inclusiveness of the event and as a transition to the eventual name, "Family Weekend".

Other activities
Fall 1991 brought the control of the coordination of Freshman Runs to the Chamber. Previously, the Chamber assisted the sophomore class in operating this event. Other activities include the sale of Slime Caps (1920), the Card Section (1952–1989), Football Program Sales (1960), Baylor University Athletic Hall of Fame (1960), Bear Bash (1968), the Baylor Faculty Jamboree (1990), the Robert L. Reid Distinguished Lecture Series (1992), and Banners, as well as many other projects to help meet the needs of the Baylor community.

John Clifton Memorial Scholarship
October 10, 1967 marked the death of John Clifton, a pledge of the Baylor Chamber of Commerce. In 1968, a John Clifton Memorial Reading Room was established in Moody Library, and the John Clifton Memorial Scholarship was instigated. Through various donations by Chamber Alumni and fund raising projects by the Chamber, the endowment for the scholarship was completed in the Fall Semester, 1975.

Changes
The most notable change of late came when women were allowed to rush and pledge as part of the membership accession process. As an organization, the Chamber has experienced its ups and downs; most notably in its history, the Chamber has mourned two deaths.

The first was that of John Clifton, a pledge from Crosby, Texas who died of asphyxiation during pledge activities in the fall of 1967.  A scholarship was created in his honor.

The second death occurred on April 5, 1990 just at the conclusion of Diadeloso, a holiday unique to Baylor University students that takes place every Spring. Spanish for "The Day of the Bear", Diadeloso is hosted by Chamber, and consists of a day-long festival of events on the Baylor campus.
The 1990 Diadeloso was chaired by Scott Adams, a senior religion major from Edmond, Oklahoma.
As the event wound down late in the day, a group of Chambermen, including Scott, were sitting in the bed of a pickup truck while breaking everything down and unloading from the day's events.
As the group was driving down University Parks Drive, the sign Scott was sitting on was lifted by the wind. Scott and the sign were blown out of the bed of the truck. Scott fell head-first to the ground, and never regained consciousness.  He was pronounced dead several hours later. Reports indicated cause of death as a punctured aorta caused by a fractured collarbone.
Scott, who intended on going into ministry, had planned on staying at Baylor for a fifth year to train and take care of a bear cub in preparation for becoming the next Baylor Bear trainer.   The cub was subsequently named "Judge Scotty" in remembrance of Scott. Just days before the accident, he had also been named the Chairman for the fall 1990 Homecoming celebration.

Currently
Notwithstanding those low-points, Chamber members have always remained extremely dedicated in their service to the university. Today, Chamber is mostly known for its role in caretaking for the live Baylor Bear mascots, as well as orchestrating major university-wide events at Baylor such as Homecoming, Diadeloso, Traditions Rally, and Family Weekend. The organization is also responsible for coordinating the Baylor Line. The organization is also known for odd, secretive, and traditional behavior - all of which contribute to the reputation of its members as student-guardians of Baylor. Chamber is also in charge of the Baylor Line during home games.

The Chamber's history is incomplete as each day passes, for the Baylor Chamber of Commerce is making history each day.  They have remembered the traditions of the men of 1919, 'Anything for Baylor.'-Perry F. Webb, Jr.

Notable alumni
Ken Paxton - Texas Attorney General
Don Willett - Justice on the Supreme Court of Texas
Clyde Hart - Track Coach
Leon Jaworski - Attorney
Roxanne Wilson - Attorney
Bill Daniel - Governor
Brad Carson - U.S. Congressman and Defense Department Official

References

External links
 Baylor University web site
 Baylor University Chamber of Commerce web site
 Baylor University Homecoming web site
 Baylor University Parent & Family Weekend web site
 Baylor University Diadeloso web site
 Baylor University Bear Program web site

External Historical Links

Student societies in the United States
1969 establishments in Texas
Baylor University
Student organizations established in 1969